The Amber Spas are four German seaside resorts on the island of Usedom, that originally formed an administrative unit called Amt Insel Usedom-Mitte:
 Koserow – Ostseebad
 Loddin – Ostseebad
 Ückeritz – Ostseebad
 Zempin – Ostseebad

External links 

Website of the Amber Spas (German)
Usedom Tourism website (auto-translated version)

Usedom
Vorpommern-Greifswald